Phutthamonthon is a district (amphoe) in the east of Nakhon Pathom province, central Thailand.

Geography
Neighbouring districts are (from the north clockwise): Bang Len; the districts Sai Noi, Bang Yai and Bang Kruai of Nonthaburi province; the district Thawi Watthana of Bangkok, and Sam Phran and Nakhon Chai Si.

History
The minor district (king amphoe) was created on 1 April 1991, when three tambon were split off from Nakhon Chai Si district. It was upgraded to a full district on 5 December 1996.

Buildings

The most important building in the district is the Phutthamonthon park, a 40 hectare Buddhist park. The district was named after the park. Its name means "Mandala of the Buddha".

One of the three campuses of Mahidol University is also in Salaya.

Administration
The district is divided into three subdistricts (tambons), which are further subdivided into 18 villages (mubans). Salaya has township (thesaban tambon) status and covers parts of tambon Salaya. Each of the tambon is administered by a tambon administrative organization (TAO).

References

External links
amphoe.com

Phutthamonthon